The 2017 Deutsche Tourenwagen Masters was the thirty-first season of premier German touring car championship and also eighteenth season under the moniker of Deutsche Tourenwagen Masters since the series' resumption in 2000. The season is scheduled to run from 6 May until 15 October over 18 races. René Rast won his first DTM championship after a total of nine events.

Supplier changes
German wheel rim company ATS became official standard control wheel rim supplier from 2017 season onwards as it was announced on 15 March 2016.
 Hankook Tire extend their DTM tyre supplier role until 2019 as the South Korean tyre company announced on 6 May 2016.

Rule changes

Sporting rules
On 17 September 2016, DTM announced that the field may be reduced from 24 to 18 competitors.
The DTM race formats will be changed to 55 minutes respectively for race 1 and race 2 as it was announced on 30 March 2017.
The team-to-driver radio has been banned for 2017 season onwards as it was announced on 1 May 2017.
The simultaneously 4 tyre change in the pit stop has been replaced by the separated 4 tyre change in the pit stop to make longer pit duration up to 10 seconds (similar to 24 Hours of Le Mans).
Points will be awarded for qualification positions with the top three earning points.

Technical rules
After using single-element rear wings for five seasons, the rear wing of all DTM cars has been changed back from a single-element plane wing to a dual-element plane wing. The double-element rear wing was last featured in the DTM in the 2011 season.
All DTM engines from 2017 season will be increased to 500 bhp as well as the increase of intake air restrictors diameter to 29 mm.
All DTM entrants to utilize all-new Hankook tyre compounds from 2017 season to produce aggressive grip.

Mid-season changes
The allocation of Balance of Performance DTM car weights were revised again for fine tuning.
After several criticisms and protests from DTM teams, the Balance of Performance DTM car weights were officially abolished just before Austrian race.

Teams and drivers
The following manufacturers, teams and drivers competed in the 2017 Deutsche Tourenwagen Masters. All teams competed with tyres supplied by Hankook.

Team changes
Audi Sport Team Abt Sportsline announced that they were scaling down from four cars to a two-car team, moving in line with Audi Sport Team Phoenix and Audi Sport Team Rosberg.
BMW Team RBM and BMW Team RMG respectively increased their number of entries from two to three cars each to fill up the two empty spots left by Team Schnitzer and Team MTEK.
 Leaving DTM
Both Mercedes-Benz DTM teams ART Grand Prix and Mücke Motorsport ceased their DTM involvement due to the reduction in the DTM field to 18 cars (6 per manufacturer) as well as ART Grand Prix focusing on junior single-seater formulas.
Both BMW DTM teams Team Schnitzer and Team MTEK also ceased their DTM involvement for similar reasons.

Driver changes
 Entering DTM
 René Rast, who replaced Mattias Ekström in the final round of DTM 2016, got his full seat with Audi.
 2013 24 Hours of Le Mans winner and WEC champion driver Loïc Duval made his DTM debut with Audi.
 2015 FIA GT World Cup winner and Venturi Formula E driver Maro Engel returned to DTM with Mercedes after leaving the series in 2011.

 Changing teams
 The 2016 DTM championship runner-up Edoardo Mortara left Audi to join Mercedes.

 Leaving DTM
 Former champions Martin Tomczyk and Timo Scheider announced that they would both retire from DTM championship after 16 years.
 BMW driver António Félix da Costa announced that he would leave DTM at the end of the 2016 season to focus on Formula E.
 Audi drivers Miguel Molina (between 2010 and 2016) and Adrien Tambay (between 2012 and 2016), both left the series.
 Daniel Juncadella, Christian Vietoris and Maximilian Götz who all drove full-time in 2016, and Felix Rosenqvist, who was a midseason replacement, were all left off the Mercedes squad in 2017.

Calendar
The nine event calendar was announced on 16 December 2016. All races from 2016 will return in 2017.

Championship standings
Scoring system
Points were awarded to the top ten classified finishers as follows:

Additionally, starting 2017, the top three placed drivers in qualifying will also receive points.

Drivers' championship

† — Driver retired, but was classified as they completed 75% of the winner's race distance.

Manufacturers' championship

Teams' championship

References

External links

  

Deutsche Tourenwagen Masters seasons
Deutsche Tourenwagen Masters